Mandagout is a commune in the Gard department in southern France. The 18th-century French pharmacist, chemist and encyclopediste Jacques Montet (17221782) was born in Mandagout.

Geography

Climate

Mandagout has a hot-summer Mediterranean climate (Köppen climate classification Csa) closely bordering on a warm-summer Mediterranean climate (Csb).

Population

See also
Communes of the Gard department

References

Communes of Gard